Robert Isaac Oleen Russell (born July 16, 1979) is a former Ghanaian American soccer player.

Career

College

Russell was born in Accra, Ghana, but grew up in Amherst, Massachusetts, and played college soccer at Duke University from 1997 to 2000 and decided he would play internationally in Iceland.

Professional
Russell turned professional in 2001 and spent one season at Icelandic club Breiðablik. He was drafted by the Los Angeles Galaxy of Major League Soccer but opted to try his fortunes overseas.

Russell joined Sogndal of the Norwegian Premier League, where he established himself as one of the best right backs in Norway.  This fact was confirmed when Rosenborg BK also from Norway made a move for him in 2004.  Russell became a starter at right back in his first season with Rosenborg BK (including two starts for the team in the UEFA Champions League) and helped the team win its 19th league title.  Unfortunately he only played in a couple of matches in 2005 due to a knee injury and a change in the coaching staff. In July 2006, Russell moved to Viborg FF of the Danish Superliga. His debut for Viborg FF came in a 3–1 loss at Aalborg BK.

In July 2008, Russell ended his Scandinavian sojourn by signing with Real Salt Lake, where coach Jason Kreis was a fellow alumnus of Duke University.

On November 23, 2009, Russell scored the game-winning goal of the 2009 MLS Cup in the seventh round of a penalty kick shoot out. The goal gave Real Salt Lake their first MLS championship.  On May 29, 2010 he scored his first career goal for Real Salt Lake in a 4–1 victory over the Kansas City Wizards at Rio Tinto Stadium.

On November 29, 2011, Russell was traded to D.C. United for a third-round pick in the 2013 MLS SuperDraft, which became a first-round pick in the 2013 MLS Supplemental Draft when the SuperDraft was shortened.

Russell announced his retirement from professional soccer on May 15, 2013. He began classes in June 2013 in Georgetown University's Post-baccalaureate Pre-Medical Certificate Program.

International
Although Russell never earned a cap for the United States national team, he was called into national team camps as an option for the United States right back position.

Medical career
Robert Russell enrolled in Medical School at The George Washington University School of Medicine and Health Sciences. He is currently an Emergency Medicine resident at the University of Virginia in Charlottesville, Virginia.

Honors

Real Salt Lake
Major League Soccer MLS Cup (1): 2009
Major League Soccer Eastern Conference Championship (1): 2009

Rosenborg
Norwegian Premier League (1): Norwegian Premier League 2004

References
This article incorporates public domain text from the Voice of America.

External links

1979 births
Living people
American soccer players
American expatriate soccer players
American people of Ghanaian descent
Duke University alumni
Duke Blue Devils men's soccer players
Breiðablik UBK players
Sogndal Fotball players
Rosenborg BK players
Viborg FF players
Real Salt Lake players
D.C. United players
Eliteserien players
American expatriate sportspeople in Iceland
Expatriate footballers in Iceland
American expatriate sportspeople in Norway
Expatriate footballers in Norway
American expatriate sportspeople in Denmark
Expatriate men's footballers in Denmark
Danish Superliga players
Major League Soccer players
LA Galaxy draft picks
Articles containing video clips
Association football defenders